Ken Rozenboom (born 1951) is the Iowa State Senator from the 19th District. A Republican, he has served in the Iowa Senate since being elected in 2013. Born and raised in Oskaloosa, Iowa Rozenboom graduated Pella Christian High School before attending Calvin College in Michigan. After college, he returned home to work on the family farm along with also working as a sales production manager. He stepped into politics when he became Mahaska County Supervisor in 2010, going on to serve two years until 2012. He currently resides in Oskaloosa with his wife Becky. They have two children and four grandchildren.

As of February 2020, Rozenboom serves on the following committees: Natural Resources and Environment (Chair), Agriculture, Appropriations, Education, and State Government. He also serves on the Agriculture and Natural Resources Appropriations Subcommittee (Vice Chair), and Flood Mitigation Board.

In March 2019, Rozenboom was awarded the Herbert Hoover Award for his years of service to the community.

Due to redistricting, Rozenboom announced that he would not seek re-election to the Iowa Senate following changes caused by redistricting which effected his current representation.

Electoral history

References 

Republican Party Iowa state senators
Living people
County supervisors in Iowa
People from Oskaloosa, Iowa
1951 births
21st-century American politicians
Calvin University alumni